In November 2017, tensions developed in Mimika Regency of Papua following a blockade of two villages by the National Liberation Army of West Papua, the military arm of the Free Papua Movement (OPM). The Government of Indonesia described the situation as a "hostage crisis", with the Indonesian Police reporting that 1,300 people were held hostage. Other sources, such as human rights lawyer Veronica Koman, or, later, local authorities, denied the "hostage crisis" claim, as OPM had been primarily establishing roadblocks impeding access to the affected villages.

Prior to the blockade, tensions in the region has flared up, with shooting incidents killing 1 Indonesian police officer and wounding 6 others. Following a breakdown in negotiations, a military operation was held on 17 November, which resulted in the OPM fighters abandoning the villages. AsiaNews reported that two dead OPM members were found. In total, 2 police officers were killed and seven were injured.

References

Conflicts in 2017
2017 in Indonesia
Blockades
Papua conflict
History of Central Papua